Shchelokovka is a rural locality (a khutor) in Moretskoye Rural Settlement, Yelansky District, Volgograd Oblast, Russia. The population was 132 as of 2010.

Geography 
Shchelokovka is located on Khopyorsko-Buzulukskaya Plain, on the left bank of the Vyazovka River, 35 km northeast of Yelan (the district's administrative centre) by road. Novodobrinka is the nearest rural locality.

References 

Rural localities in Yelansky District